A soft count is one process for counting banknotes in a casino or bank.  The soft count rooms are usually among the most secure places due to the large amounts of cash that can be on hand at any one time.

History
Some smaller volume cash businesses still operate a count room in the original fashion. The count room is operated by at least three people, the first two of whom independently count stacks of currency and record the results on a count card. The third person examines the two count cards to amount recorded is the same. If there is a difference the currency is recounted.

Counting is usually done by accounting professionals called soft counters, usually using computer spreadsheets.

Typically, a soft count room contains a large "count table" upon which the currency is placed. Count room personnel manually organize the currency so that it can be easily counted by hand or by a counting machine.

Most modern count rooms are equipped with high-speed computerized counting machines. Typically, these machines can count between ten and twenty banknotes per second. After currency is prepared on the count table, it is transferred to the machine's operator, who inserts the prepared stacks into the machine. The machine authenticates each banknote, separates the counted banknotes according to denomination, and provides a printed or electronic report of the results.

References 

Banking terms
Banknotes
Casinos